Joseph Bigger may refer to:
 Joseph Biggar ( 1828–1890), Irish nationalist MP
 Francis Joseph Bigger (1863–1926), Irish antiquarian, revivalist, solicitor, architect, author, editor
 Joseph Warwick Bigger (1891–1951), Irish senator and academic